"Two Sparrows in a Hurricane" is a song written by Mark Alan Springer and recorded by American country music artist Tanya Tucker. It was released in September 1992 as the first single from the album Can't Run from Yourself. The song reached No. 2 on the Billboard Hot Country Singles & Tracks chart in December, behind George Strait's "I Cross My Heart".

Music video
The music video was directed by Joanne Gardner and premiered in October 1992. It shows Tanya performing the song against a rose-colored background and a black background, as well as a storyline involving a couple in three time periods in an apartment bedroom. First, the young woman walks to an open window as the man comes through to see her. She gives her flowers, which she puts on the nightstand. The next scene shows them as now parents with two kids (one of which is a newborn) playing around on the bed. The man sees the woman is tired and tries to talk to her, but she just lets it go. She is then seen kissing the now dressed man. The final scene shows the couple as now elderly and living in the same apartment. The woman is first seen reading as the man comes in. He picks up his glasses and a newspaper and sits beside her. The man is then seen in bed; she comes over and kisses him and they smile at each other. It ends with a dedication to Tanya's parents (Beau and Juanita), who celebrated their 50th anniversary the year the video was made.

Chart performance

Year-end charts

References

1992 singles
Tanya Tucker songs
Liberty Records singles
Songs written by Mark Alan Springer
Song recordings produced by Jerry Crutchfield
1992 songs